| player              = 
| prevseason          = Clausura 2019
| nextseason          = 2021–22

}}
The 2019–20 Copa MX was the 82nd staging of the Copa MX, the 54th staging in the professional era and the fifteenth tournament played since the 1996–97 edition. The tournament started on 30 July 2019 and ended on 4 November 2020.

It marked the first year since it was restored in 2012 that only one tournament will be played in the Mexican football year. In previous years, two tournaments (Apertura and Clausura) were played throughout the year.

América were the defending champions after they defeated Juárez 0–1 in the Clausura 2019 final.

The winners would have qualified for the 2020 Leagues Cup. However, the Leagues Cup was canceled due to the COVID-19 pandemic in North America.

Participants
This tournament featured the 15 clubs from Liga MX who did not participate in the 2020 CONCACAF Champions League (América, Cruz Azul, León, and UANL).

The tournament also featured the top 12 Ascenso MX teams of the 2018–19 aggregate table not promoted to Liga MX.

Draw
The draw for the tournament took place on 12 June 2019 in Cancún. 27 teams were drawn into nine groups of three, with each group containing one team from each of the three pots.

Clubs in Pot 1 were drawn to be the seed of each group according to the order of their drawing. That is, the first club that was drawn is seed of Group 1, the second drawn is seed of Group 2 and so on and so on. The Liga MX teams in Pot 1 are the five best teams in the 2018–19 Liga MX aggregate table not participating in the 2020 CONCACAF Champions League. Pot 1 also contains the top four Ascenso MX teams in the 2018–19 Ascenso MX aggregate table.

Pot 2 contains the next five best placed Liga MX clubs in the 2018–19 Liga MX aggregate table and Ascenso MX clubs who ended 7–11 in the 2018–19 Ascenso MX aggregate table. Pot 2 also contains Juárez who replaced Lobos BUAP (ranked 13th in Liga MX aggregate table) in Liga MX.

Pot 3 contains the next five Liga MX clubs in the 2018–19 Liga MX aggregate table and the Ascenso MX clubs who ended 12–14 in the 2018–19 Ascenso MX aggregate table. Pot 3 also contains recently promoted Atlético San Luis.

Teams

Tiebreakers
If two or more clubs are equal on points on completion of the group matches, the following criteria are applied to determine the rankings:

 scores of the group matches played among the clubs in question;
 superior goal difference;
 higher number of goals scored;
 higher number of goals scored away in the group matches played among the clubs in question;
 fair play ranking;
 drawing of lots.

Group stage
Every group is composed of three clubs, each group has at least one club from Liga MX and Ascenso MX.

All match times listed are UTC–6, except for matches in Ciudad Juárez, Culiacán (both UTC–7), Hermosillo and Tijuana (both UTC–8).

Group 1

Group 2

Group 3

Group 4

Group 5

Group 6

Group 7

Group 8

Group 9

Ranking of second-placed teams

Knockout stage
The clubs that advance to this stage will be ranked and seeded 1 to 16 based on performance in the group stage. In case of ties, the same tiebreakers used to rank the runners-up will be used.
The winners of the groups and the seven best second place teams of each group will advance to the Knockout stage.
Unlike previous editions, the 16 qualified teams will play a single-elimination tournament. Each tie will be played on a home-and-away two-legged basis. There is no away goals rule. If the aggregate score is tied after the second leg, it will proceed directly to a penalty shoot-out. The highest seeded club will host each match, regardless of which division each club belongs.

Qualified teams
The nine group winners and the seven best runners-up from the group stage qualify for the final stage.

Seeding

Bracket

Round of 16

Summary
The first legs were played on 21–22 January, and the second legs were played on 28–29 January.

|}

Matches

Monterrey won 7–3 on aggregate

4–4 on aggregate. Toluca won 5–3 on penalty kicks.

4–4 on aggregate. Morelia won 3–2 on penalty kicks.

Juárez won 5–4 on aggregate

2–2 on aggregate. Sinaloa won 6–5 on penalty kicks.

Tijuana won 2–0 on aggregate

Pachuca won 4–2 on aggregate

Santos Laguna won 5–4 on aggregate

Quarterfinals

Summary
The first legs were played on 11–12 February 2020, and the second legs were played on 18–19 February 2020.

|}

Matches

Monterrey won 1–0 on aggregate

Toluca won 7–3 on aggregate

Tijuana won 3–1 on aggregate

Juárez won 3–0 on aggregate

Semifinals

Summary
The first legs were played on 3–4 March 2020, and the second legs were played on 10–11 March 2020.

|}

Matches

2–2 on aggregate. Monterrey won 6–5 on penalty kicks.

Tijuana won 7–3 on aggregate

Finals

Summary
The first and second legs were scheduled to be played on 8 April 2020 and 22 April 2020 but were postponed due to the COVID-19 pandemic in Mexico to 21 October and 4 November 2020.

|}

Matches

Monterrey won 2–1 on aggregate

Top goalscorers
Players sorted first by goals scored, then by last name.

Players and teams in bold are still active in the competition.

Source: Liga MX

Notes

References

External links
Official site

Copa MX
2019–20 in Mexican football
Copa MX
Copa MX